Don or the Don is the nickname of:

 Don Cheadle (born 1964), an American actor, writer, producer, and director.
 Don Rickles (1926–2017), American stand-up comedian, actor and author
 Don Henley (born 1947), American singer-songwriter, producer, drummer and founding member of the Eagles
 Don Johnson (born 1949), American actor, producer, director, singer, and songwriter
 John Gotti (1940–2002), Italian-American gangster and former boss of the Gambino crime family; known as "The Dapper Don", and also as "The Teflon Don"
 Don Cherry (born 1934), Canadian ice hockey commentator for CBC Television
 Don King (born 1931), American boxing promoter renowned for making historic boxing matchups
 Don Omar (1978), Puerto Rican singer, songwriter and actor
 Don Knotts (1924–2006), American comedic actor, best known as Barney Fife on The Andy Griffith Show
 Don McLean (born 1945), American singer-songwriter best known for the hit song: "American Pie"
 Donald Trump (born 1946), American businessman and 45th President of the United States of America; affectionately known as "the Don"
 Donald Trump Jr. (born 1977), American businessman and former reality TV personality
 Don Bradman (1908–2001), Australian cricketer also called "the Don" as well
 Don Nelson (born 1940), American former NBA player and head coach
 Don Imus (1940–2019), American radio host, humorist, and landscape photographer
 Don Muraco (born 1949), American retired professional wrestler
 Don Shula (1930–2020), professional American football coach and player
 Don Sutton (1945–2021), American professional baseball player
 Don Drysdale (1936–1993), American professional baseball player and television sports commentator
 Don Meredith (1938–2010), American football quarterback, sports commentator and actor

See also 

 
 

Lists of people by nickname